Trinity—Conception was a federal electoral district in Newfoundland and Labrador, Canada, that was represented in the House of Commons of Canada from 1949 to 1968.

This riding was created in 1949 when Newfoundland joined the Canadian Confederation.

It was abolished in 1966 when it was merged into Bonavista—Trinity—Conception riding.

It consisted of the Districts of Trinity North, Trinity South, Carbonear-Bay de Verde, Harbour Grace, and Port de Grave.

Members of Parliament

This riding elected the following Members of Parliament:

Election results

See also 

 List of Canadian federal electoral districts
 Past Canadian electoral districts

External links 
 Riding history for Trinity—Conception (1949–1966) from the Library of Parliament

Former federal electoral districts of Newfoundland and Labrador